Below are the nominees and winners for the BET Award for Best Actress and Best Movie.

Best Movie

-This category was introduced during the 2010, ceremony.

Best Actress
Most Wins:
1. Taraji P. Henson - 5 wins
2. Halle Berry - 3 wins
3. Viola Davis, Jennifer Hudson, Regina King, Sanaa Lathan, Queen Latifah & Mo'Nique - 1 win 
 Most Nominations:
1. Taraji P. Henson - 8 nominations
2. Angela Bassett - 6 nominations
3. Halle Berry - 6 nominations
4. Regina King - 5 nominations
5. Queen Latifah - 4 nominations
6. Sanaa Lathan, Zoe Saldana, Gabrielle Union & Chandra Wilson - 3 nominations
7. Aaliyah, Tichina Arnold, Vivica A. Fox, Jennifer Hudson & Beyoncé Knowles & Kerry Washington - 2 nominations
 Oscar-winning or -nominated actresses that have won or earned nominations in this category: Angela Bassett, Halle Berry, Viola Davis, Taraji P. Henson, Jennifer Hudson, Queen Latifah, Mo'Nique, Gabourey Sidibe & Alfre Woodard
Singers/rappers turned actors that earned nomination or wins in this category: Aaliyah, Jennifer Hudson, Beyoncé Knowles, Queen Latifah & Jill Scott

BET Awards
Film awards for lead actress